Claude Brumachon (born 2 May 1959 in Rouen) is a French choreographer and dancer in contemporary dance. In 1984 he founded his own company, the Compagnie Claude Brumachon. Since 1992, he has been co-directing the Centre Chorégraphique National de Nantes (National Choreographic Centre of Nantes), with Benjamin Lamarche.

He has won several concours de Bagnolet awards:
 in 1984 with Atterrissage de corneilles sur l'Autoroute du sud (three awards)
 in 1988 with Texane

Creations 

 1982: Niverolles, duo du col
 1983: Il y a des engoulevents sur la branche d'à côté
 1983: Épervière
 1984: Atterrissage de corneilles sur l'Autoroute du sud
 1984: Nyroca Furie
 1984: Le Sirli de Béjaïa (for the Jeune Ballet de France)
 1984: La Tristesse des pingouins dans l'Arctique
 1985: Oc le narquois et Oriane l'effraie
 1986: Le Roncier où songe l'aimante Pie-Grièche
 1986: Vagabond des Bastides
 1986: La Dérive des fous à pieds bleus
 1987: Attila et Nana, les moineaux friquets
 1987: Les Querelles de Harfangs (for the Jeune Ballet de France)
 1987: La Complainte du Gerfaut
 1988: Texane
 1988: Bricolage Secret
 1988: Le Piédestal des vierges
 1988: Les Naufragés
 1989: Féline (commissioned by the Groupe de recherche chorégraphique de l'Opéra de Paris)
 1989: Folie
 1989: Le Chapelier Travail du chapeau
 1990: L'enfant et les sortilèges (for the Opéra de Nantes)
 1991: Éclats d'Absinthe
 1991: Fauves
 1992: Alice aux pays des Merveilles
 1992: Les Funambules du Désir (for the Jeune Ballet de France and the Ballet Philippines)
 1992: Lame de Fond
 1992: Les Indomptés
 1992: Vertige
 1992: Les déambulations de Lola
 1992: Alice aux pays des Merveilles
 1992: Les Funambules du Désir (for the Jeune Ballet de France and the Ballet Philippines)
 1992: Lame de Fond
 1992: Les Indomptés
 1992: Vertige
 1992: Les déambulations de Lola
 1993: Nina ou la voleuse d'esprit (performed at Musée des Beaux-Arts de Nantes)
 1993: Émigrants
 1993: Les Amants gris (for the Conservatoire national supérieur de musique et de danse de Paris)
 1994: Bohèmes Hommes
 1995: Les Avalanches
 1996: Les Larmes des Dieux
 1996: Una Vita
 1996: Icare
 1997: Bohèmes Femmes
 1997: Le Magicien d'Oz
 1997: La Blessure (duo commissioned by Marie-Claude Pietragalla)
 1997: Les Nuits perdues (Kadotetut Yöt, commissioned by the Raatikko Ballet of Vantaa)
 1997: Los Ruegos
 1997: Une Aventure Extraordinaire
 1998: Dandy
 1998: Humains dites-vous !
 1999: La fracture de l'âme
 1999: Embrasés
 1999: Les murailles d'hermine (commissioned by the Ballet du Rhin)
 1999: La femme qui voulait parler avec le vent
 1999: Les voyageurs d'innocence (for the Ballet de Marseille)
 1999: Absence
 2000: Hôtel Central
 2000: Imprévus ou les porteurs de rêves
 2000: Pinocchio
 2000: Les Chemins oubliés ou le temps d'un songe (homage to Jules Verne)
 2001: Rebelles
 2001: Les Coquelicots Sauvages
 2002: Voyages de Gulliver
 2002: L'Ombre des Mots
 2002: Le Témoin (Bohémia Magica festival)
 2003: Boxeurs et Vagabondes
 2003: Écorchés Vifs (performed at Musée Bourdelle)
 2003: L'héroïne ou la gloire imprudente (commissioned by the Ballet de Lorraine)
 2004: Le Festin
 2005: Orphée (performed at Grand Théâtre de Limoges)
 2005: Les Petits Poètes
 2005: La Mélancolie des Profondeurs (with vocal ensemble A Sei Voci)
 2006: Ellipse
 2007: Histoire d'Argan le Visionnaire
 2007: Silence
 2007: Phobos
 2008: Le Labyrinthe
 2008: Androgynes
 2009: Les Explorateurs de Temps
 2009: Merveilleux
 2009: Les Fugues
 2009: La Désobéissance (rituel)
 2009: Liberté (premiered in Nantes at "Le Grand T" theatre on 7 January 2010)
 2010: Le Prince de Verre

Decorations 
 Commander of the Order of Arts and Letters (2016)

References 

  Claude Brumachon's work (pages 12–15)

External links 
  Centre Chorégraphique National de Nantes

1959 births
Living people
Ballet choreographers
Contemporary dance choreographers
French choreographers
French male dancers
Contemporary dancers
Commandeurs of the Ordre des Arts et des Lettres